The College of Agriculture, Lakhimpur Kheri is a government agriculture college in Lakhimpur Kheri, Uttar Pradesh, India. It is part of Chandra Shekhar Azad University of Agriculture and Technology.

See also
Chandra Shekhar Azad University of Agriculture & Technology
Baba Saheb Dr. B.R.A. College of Agriculture Engineering & Technology
College of Dairy Technology
College of Fisheries Science and Research Centre, Etawah

References 

Agricultural universities and colleges in Uttar Pradesh
Chandra Shekhar Azad University of Agriculture and Technology
Lakhimpur Kheri district
2015 establishments in Uttar Pradesh
Educational institutions established in 2015